Florida is the fourth studio album by Swedish folk musician Sofia Talvik. It was released in 2010.

Track listing

Critical reception
A reviewer for CD Baby wrote: "It's not often that an album takes your breath away, and I hate to sound hyperbolic, but Florida actually has several 'Oh my god!' moments of sheer beauty."

References

External links
 Florida by Sofia Talvik on Bandcamp

2010 albums
Sofia Talvik albums